In the 1858 Chicago mayoral election, Republican John Charles Haines defeated Daniel Brainard.

The election was held on March 2.

Results

References

1858
Chicago
1858 Illinois elections
1850s in Chicago